The Dapitan Heritage Zone or Dapitan Historic Center is a declared historic district in Dapitan, Philippines. Because of its prehistoric origins, collection of heritage structures and role in the exile of local patriot Dr. Jose Rizal, the National Historical Commission of the Philippines declared a specific portion of the city, along with its heritage structures, as a Heritage Zone or Historic Center in 2011. The declaration was made in coordination with the 150th birth anniversary of Dr. Rizal in June 2011.

Rationale for Declaration as Heritage Zone/Historic Center
The NHCP board resolution cites several reasons for the declaration of certain areas in downtown Dapitan as Heritage Zone/Historic Center:
Dapitan is considered as one of the oldest settlements in Northern Mindanao
Dapitan was founded as a mission by the Jesuits in 1629
Dr. Jose Rizal was exiled in Dapitan, initially detained at the Casa Real before being transferred to Talisay (now the José Rizal Memorial Protected Landscape in Dapitan)
Downtown Dapitan showcases a good number of heritage structures, some of which are officially declared by national government agencies as National Historical Landmarks and National Cultural Treasure

List of Cultural Properties of the Philippines in Dapitan 

|}

See also
 Philippine Registry of Cultural Property
 List of historical markers of the Philippines in Zamboanga Peninsula

References

External links
 List of Board Resolutions of the National Historical Commission of the Philippines
 Republic Act No. 10066 - National Cultural Heritage Act of 2009

Dapitan
Historic sites in the Philippines
Heritage zones in the Philippines